Përlepnicë Lake (/ Jezero Prilepnica) is a small lake situated in western Kosovo, surrounded by the Gollak mountains. Prilepnica Lake is found just north-east of the city of Gjilan, also it supplies water for the city. A tributary of the South Morava flows through the lake and it is the largest lake in the east of Kosovo.

References 

Lakes of Kosovo